Eric Ogden is an American photographer, artist and director.

Early life
Eric was born and raised in Flint, Michigan. Ogden studied at the University of Michigan in Ann Arbor before moving to New York City.

Career
Eric currently lives in Brooklyn, New York, and travels frequently on assignment. His photographs have appeared in The New Yorker, Vanity Fair, Esquire, W, WSJ., The New York Times Magazine, Newsweek, Time, Wired, Vogue, Rolling Stone, Teen Vogue, Details, New York, Men's Journal, Interview, Glamour, Spin, and the Los Angeles Times Magazine, as well as advertising for NBC, USA, ABC, A&E, Turner, Fox, Syfy, and the CW television networks, Discovery Channel, Nissan, Nike, Sean John, Island Def Jam, Atlantic Records, Sony Music, Warner Bros Records, RCA Records, Miramax and Paramount Pictures.

Films
Paperboy (short)
The Call (short)
Nocturne (short)
Motel (short)

Press
2020 – "A Dystopian Vision", feature and interview, Aesthetica, June, 2020.
2018 – "Hidden Narratives", portfolio, Aesthetica, February, 2018.
2017 – "Eric Ogden's Nocturne of Fear", Motion Arts Pro, American Photography/American Illustration, May, 2017
2016 – "From the Desk Of: Eric Ogden", blog feature, Paper Chase Press, September, 2016.
2016 – "Photo of the Day", Don't Take Pictures, April, 2016.
2016 – "Visitors: Essay 033", portfolio, The Photographic Journal, March, 2016.
2016 – "Photographer Profile: Eric Ogden" profile, American Photography/American Illustration, March, 2016. 
2016 – "Covert Presence" portfolio, Aesthetica, February/March, 2016. 
2014 – "About That Photo of the Reformicons", The 6th Floor: Blog, The New York Times Magazine, July, 2014.
2013 – The F Stop Blog, interview, July 2013.
2012 – "Making A Great Environmental Portrait", Photo District News, February, 2012.
2011 – "Cinematic Portraitist Eric Ogden", LookBooks, April 18, 2011.

Awards
2022 – American Photography Annual 38 – work chosen for Annual Awards
2021 – American Photography Annual 37 – work selected & published in Annual Award book
2020 – Society of Publication Designers Merit Award: Documentary Photography
2019 – Best Editing, Grand Prize for Motel. Flickers' Rhode Island International Film Festival.
2019 – American Photography Annual 35
2017 – American Photography Annual 33
2015 – American Photography Annual 31
2014 – International Motion Art Awards 3 - for short film "The Call" starring Anna Kendrick
2012 – FWA Site of the Day & Adobe The Cutting Edge Project of the Week "Get Winter Ready" interactive site
2010 – American Photography Annual 27 
2008 – American Photography Annual 24
2008 – Society of Publication Designers Award: Feature/Photography
2007 – American Photography Annual 23
2005 – Photo District News '30 Emerging Photographers to Watch'

Solo exhibitions
2010 – A Half-Remembered Season, Hous Projects LA, West Hollywood, CA
2010 – A Half-Remembered Season, Hous Projects Gallery, New York City, NY

Group exhibitions
2011 – Visions on Film, 5th Triennale der Photographie Hamburg, Hamburg, Germany
2010 – Versus, Hous Projects Gallery, New York City, NY
2009 – Character Project, Stephan Weiss Studio, New York City, NY
2009 – Character Project, Edison Place Gallery (PEPCO), Washington, DC
2009 – Character Project, Wexler Gallery, Philadelphia, PA
2009 – Character Project, Alan Koppel Gallery, Chicago, IL
2009 – Character Project, Regional Arts Commission, St. Louis, MO
2009 – Character Project, Chronicle Books Headquarters, San Francisco, CA
2009 – Character Project, ACE Gallery Beverly Hills, Los Angeles, CA
2006 – Dreams, Fears, Desires, Holden Luntz Gallery, Palm Beach, FL
2004 – Art Commerce Festival of Emerging Photographers, NY, NY

References

External links
 
 "Hidden Narratives", portfolio in Aesthetica magazine

Living people
American photographers
People from Flint, Michigan
University of Michigan alumni
Year of birth missing (living people)